The Socialist Nation Party is an Iraqi political party that was founded by Salih Jabr in 1951. The party sough to gain popularity by adopting socialism, Arab nationalism, and democratic principles. It was faced by enormous amount of skepticism and criticism from the Iraqi press as Jaber was known for having close ties with feudalists and tribal leaders who opposed socialism. The party opposed Nuri Al-Said policies and sought to limit his influence over Iraqi politics. It published two newspapers Al-Naba (The News), and Al-Umma (The Nation).

References

1951 establishments in Iraq
1958 disestablishments in Iraq
Defunct socialist parties in Iraq
Democratic socialist parties in Asia
Organizations based in Baghdad
Political parties disestablished in 1958
Political parties established in 1951